Labyrinth is a solitaire card game which uses a deck of 52 playing cards.  Despite the fact that the word labyrinth is synonymous with maze, this game is very different in the manner of game play and dealing from the game Maze, and should not be confused with it.  Labyrinth Solitaire does however have similar gameplay to the solitaire game Babette, and the spatial puzzle in which cards become available is also reminiscent of Crazy Quilt.

Rules
The player first takes the four Aces out of the deck and lay them down as the foundations. Then eight cards are laid in a row below these four cards.

The cards on this row can be built on the foundations up by suit up to Kings. Any gap is immediately filled by a card from the stock. Once no more moves can be made, a new row of eight cards is formed. However, once any card leaves the second row to the foundations, it is not filled; filling gaps by new cards only applies to the first row.

Only cards on the top and bottom rows are available and when a card on the bottom row is removed, the card above it is released and can be played. The same goes for a card which is below a card from the top row when that card is removed, when the player decides to fill the gap later or when the stock runs out.

As new rows are formed, chances are that there are gaps in the in-between rows except the top. These "holes" give the impression of a labyrinth, hence the name.

The dealing of new rows, putting cards to the foundations, and filling any gaps on the first row continues until the stock runs out. When the player gets stuck after this point, he can draw any card from the other rows as a last resort.

The game is won when all cards are built into the foundations.

References

See also
  Babette
 List of solitaire games
 Glossary of solitaire terms

Half-open blockades
Single-deck patience card games